Magic Orbz (previously named Magic Ball) is a game for the Sony PlayStation 3 video game console. It is based on the PC game, Magic Ball 3. The game was released in January 2009 and was followed by two additional downloadable content packs.

Gameplay
Magic Orbz is a 3D Breakout style game with a stylised game design and physics simulation. The game's visual appearance follows two themes, Pirates and Knights. As in many similar games in this genre, random power-ups fall from pieces of the level that are broken up by the ball.

The initial release of the game contains 48 normal levels + 2 bonus levels, providing 13 trophies. The "Wicked Witches" expansion includes an additional 24 Witch themed levels, 1 bonus level and 5 more trophies. The "Winter Pack" was released in January 2010 features 25 new levels. One more Level pack is listed as "Coming Soon" in the in game menu.

Magic Orbz features single player, competitive multiplayer and co-operative multiplayer modes. Multiplayer has both local and online gameplays available.

Reception 
Magic Ball has received generally average reviews with an overall score of 66 on Metacritic. IGN said "Magic Ball is a streamlined, simple game that's fun to play" while other reviews complained about the game's short playing time.

References

External links
 Game information on PlayStation blog

2009 video games
Breakout clones
Cooperative video games
Multiplayer and single-player video games
PlayStation 3 games
PlayStation 3-only games
PlayStation Network games
TikGames games
Video games about witchcraft
Video games developed in Russia